Pseudomorpha is a genus of beetles in the family Carabidae, found in North, Central, and South America.

Species
These 35 species belong to the genus Pseudomorpha:

 Pseudomorpha alleni Van Dyke, 1953
 Pseudomorpha alutacea Notman, 1925
 Pseudomorpha argentina Steinheil, 1869
 Pseudomorpha arrowi Notman, 1925
 Pseudomorpha augustata G.Horn, 1883
 Pseudomorpha behrensi G.Horn, 1870
 Pseudomorpha brevis Baehr, 1997
 Pseudomorpha caribbeana Darlington, 1936
 Pseudomorpha castanea Casey, 1909
 Pseudomorpha champlaini Notman, 1925
 Pseudomorpha confusa Notman, 1925
 Pseudomorpha consanguinea Notman, 1925
 Pseudomorpha cronkhitei G.Horn, 1867
 Pseudomorpha cylindrica Casey, 1889
 Pseudomorpha excrucians Kirby, 1823
 Pseudomorpha falli Notman, 1925
 Pseudomorpha gerstaeckeri Chaudoir, 1877
 Pseudomorpha huachinera Amundson & Erwin, 2013
 Pseudomorpha hubbardi Notman, 1925
 Pseudomorpha insignis (Sloane, 1910)
 Pseudomorpha lacordairei (Dejean & Boisduval, 1829)
 Pseudomorpha parallela Van Dyke, 1943
 Pseudomorpha patagonia Erwin & Amundson, 2013
 Pseudomorpha penablanca Amundson & Erwin, 2013
 Pseudomorpha peninsularis Van Dyke, 1953
 Pseudomorpha pilatei Chaudoir, 1862
 Pseudomorpha pima Amundson & Erwin, 2013
 Pseudomorpha santacruz Erwin & Amundson, 2013
 Pseudomorpha santarita Erwin & Amundson, 2013
 Pseudomorpha schwarzi Notman, 1925
 Pseudomorpha subangulata Baehr, 1997
 Pseudomorpha tenebroides Notman, 1925
 Pseudomorpha vandykei Notman, 1925
 Pseudomorpha vicina Notman, 1925
 Pseudomorpha vindicata Notman, 1925

References

Pseudomorphinae